Accrocca is a surname. Notable people with the surname include:

Elio Filippo Accrocca (1923–1996), Italian poet, author, and translator
Felice Accrocca (born 1959), Italian Roman Catholic ordinary and archbishop

Italian-language surnames